Lieutenant General Khwaja Mohammad Azhar Khan (usually shortened to K.M. Azhar) (1918 – 29 October 2006) was the chairman of the high-powered committee of the Jamiat Ulema-e-Pakistan and a former governor of Khyber-Pakhtunkhwa.

Early life
Lt Gen Azhar was born in Saugar, India in 1918 into the (Mian Sheikh Darvesh) Waziris and received his basic education in Aligarh, India.

General K.M. Azhar decided to join Jamiat Ulma-e-Pakistan Party after Maulana Shah Ahmad Noorani convinced him to do so in 1978.

Death and legacy
K.M. Azhar died at the Combined Military Hospital in Lahore on 29 October 2006, after receiving a head injury. He was 88 and was survived by five sons and two daughters; four of the sons being graduates of Cadet College Hasan Abdal.

Upon his death in his remembrance his Waziri tribe named a mountain peak after him in Kaniguram Village Kaniguram of South Waziristan.

References

Pakistani generals
Pakistan Hockey Federation presidents
Pakistan Cricket Board Presidents and Chairmen
Governors of Khyber Pakhtunkhwa
1918 births
2006 deaths
Pashtun people
Jamiat Ulema-e-Pakistan politicians
King Edward Medical University alumni